The Chester Pipe and Tube Company was a company incorporated in 1877 in Chester, Pennsylvania by shipbuilder John Roach for the manufacture of iron pipes and boiler tubes for the steamships built at his Chester shipyard, the Delaware River Iron Ship Building and Engine Works.

Two large brick buildings and a number of smaller ones were erected onsite, and a workforce of approximately 200 was employed there. By the early 1880s, the company was manufacturing about 18,000 tons of wrought iron pipes annually from 20,000 tons of skelp iron.

In 1880, Potts Brothers Iron Company Ltd., which owned a rolling mill in Pottstown, Pennsylvania, acquired a controlling interest in the Chester Pipe and Tube Company. Colonel Joseph D. Potts, a prominent figure in the transportation business, purchased the Potts Brothers Iron Company in 1890, and thereafter became President of the Chester Pipe and Tube Company, a position he retained until his death in 1893.

In June 1899, the Chester Pipe and Tube Company was consolidated with twenty other pipemaking firms in the northeastern United States to form the National Tube Company. In 1901, the National Tube Company and nine other major American steel companies merged to form the world's first billion dollar company, U.S. Steel.

The National Tube Company was a subsidiary of U.S. Steel until 31 December 1951 and together with a number of other wholly-owned subsidiaries in an internal corporate restructuring became a division of the United States Steel Company (a subsidiary of the U.S. Steel Corporation).

Footnotes

References
Ashmead, Graham Henry (1884): History of Delaware County, Pennsylvania, L. H. Everts & Co., Pennsylvania.
Swann, Leonard Alexander Jr. (1965): John Roach, Maritime Entrepreneur: the Years as Naval Contractor 1862–1886 — United States Naval Institute (reprinted 1980 by Ayer Publishing).
Warren, Kenneth (2001): Big Steel: the First Century of the United States Steel Corporation, 1901-2001, University of Pittsburgh Press, .
Wilson, William Bender (1902): From the Hudson to the Ohio: A Region of Historic, Romantic and Scenic Interest, and Other Sketches, Kensington Press, Philadelphia.

American companies established in 1877
Chester, Pennsylvania
Manufacturing companies established in 1877
John Roach & Sons
Companies based in Delaware County, Pennsylvania
Defunct manufacturing companies based in Pennsylvania